New Hope Christian Schools is a private Christian school founded in 1961 located in Grants Pass, Oregon, United States.

Campus and academics
The school has an observatory telescope located on campus.

The majority of the school's high school curriculum comes from Bob Jones University Press and A Beka Book.

Since June 2012, New Hope Christian School has been accredited through the Northwest Accreditation Commission (NWAC), an accreditation division of AdvancEd, a regional accrediting body for primary and secondary schools in the Northwest.

References

Private middle schools in Oregon
Grants Pass, Oregon
High schools in Josephine County, Oregon
Christian schools in Oregon
Private elementary schools in Oregon
Private high schools in Oregon
1961 establishments in Oregon